Alexander Yunkov (born November 21, 1982) is a Russian former professional ice hockey forward who played in the Russian Superleague (RSL) and the Kontinental Hockey League (KHL).

He is the brother of Mikhail Yunkov, also a professional ice hockey player, for Severstal Cherepovets of the KHL.

Honours
Pajulahti Cup:  2006 (With Severstal)

References

External links
 

1982 births
Living people
Amur Khabarovsk players
Atlant Moscow Oblast players
HC CSK VVS Samara players
HC Dynamo Moscow players
HC Khimik Voskresensk players
HK Liepājas Metalurgs players
Severstal Cherepovets players
HC Spartak Moscow players
Russian ice hockey forwards
HC Vityaz players
Traktor Chelyabinsk players
People from Voskresensk
Sportspeople from Moscow Oblast